Taimatsuden Inari Shrine is an Inari shrine in Shimogyō-ku, Kyoto, Japan.

External links

 

Buildings and structures in Kyoto
Inari shrines